Miss USA 1977 was the 26th Miss USA pageant, televised live by CBS from the Gillard Municipal Auditorium in Charleston, South Carolina on May 14, 1977.

The pageant was won by Kimberly Tomes of Texas, who was crowned by outgoing titleholder Barbara Peterson of Minnesota.  Tomes was the first woman from Texas to win the Miss USA title, and went on to place as a semi-finalist at Miss Universe 1977.

Results

Special awards

Historical significance 
 Texas wins competition for the first time and surpasses its previous highest placement in 1971. Also becoming in the 19th state who does it for the first time.
 Nevada earns the 1st runner-up position for the first time, becoming its highest placement of the state until 2014.
 Minnesota earns the 2nd runner-up position for the first time.
 California earns the 3rd runner-up position for the fourth time. The last time it placed this was in 1974.
 Virginia earns the 4th runner-up position for the first time and it reaches the highest placement since Deborah Shelton won in 1970.
 States that placed in semifinals the previous year were California, Georgia, Minnesota, New Mexico and Texas.
 California placed for the twenty-first consecutive year.
 Texas placed for the third consecutive year. 
 Georgia, Minnesota and New Mexico made their second consecutive placement.
 District of Columbia, Hawaii, New Jersey and Virginia last placed in 1975.
 Arizona and Nevada last placed in 1974.
 Maine last placed in 1970.
 Missouri breaks an ongoing streak of placements since 1974.

Delegates
The Miss USA 1977 delegates were:

 Alabama - Cheryl Burgess
 Alaska - Edith Baker
 Arizona - Toni Abranovic
 Arkansas - Debra Duree
 California - Pamela Gergely
 Colorado - Mary Anne Genzel
 Connecticut - Susan Crone
 Delaware - Debby Faulkner
 District of Columbia - Sharon Sutherland
 Florida - Linda Lefevre
 Georgia - Linda Kerr
 Hawaii - Cely de Castro
 Idaho - Leslie Kingon
 Illinois - Elizabeth Curran
 Indiana - Lynn Flaherty
 Iowa - Cindy Woodard
 Kansas - Sherry Brane
 Kentucky - Sandy Smith
 Louisiana - Patti Rosenbalm
 Maine - Tina Brown
 Maryland - Twyla Littleton
 Massachusetts - Carolyn Marcil
 Michigan - Jenny Pinks
 Minnesota - Deborah Cossette
 Mississippi - Leigh Tapley
 Missouri - Connie Ast
 Montana - Theresa Rose Bajt
 Nebraska - Debbie Ridge
 Nevada - Mary O'Neal Cantino
 New Hampshire - Belinda Bridgeman
 New Jersey - Juanita McCarty
 New Mexico - Denise Funderburk
 New York - Deborah Martin
 North Carolina - Vikki Verbyla
 North Dakota - Barbara Redlin
 Ohio - Lesa Rummell
 Oklahoma - Kathy Malchar
 Oregon - Charisse Charlton
 Pennsylvania - Lorraine Lincoski
 Rhode Island - Susan Carten
 South Carolina - Pam Hoover
 South Dakota - Ginger Thomson
 Tennessee - Rene Jean Smith
 Texas - Kimberly Tomes
 Utah - Michele Miner
 Vermont - Anne Kent
 Virginia - Lynn Herring
 Washington - Ivy Lynn Reed
 West Virginia - Pat Brown
 Wisconsin - Vicki Payne
 Wyoming - Michele Fisser

External links 
 Miss USA official website

1977
May 1977 events in the United States
1977 beauty pageants
1977 in South Carolina